D'Iberville station is a Montreal Metro station in Montreal, Quebec, Canada. It is operated by the Société de transport de Montréal (STM) and serves the Blue Line. It opened in 1986.

Overview  
It is a normal side platform station with two entrances, one of them automated. The station, clad in terra cotta, features one artwork, a large abstract aluminum mural by Eddy Tardif entitled Le Pélican, representing Pierre Le Moyne D'Iberville's ship.

Origin of name
D'Iberville is named for the rue D'Iberville, in turn named in honour of Pierre Le Moyne d'Iberville.

Station improvements
Since spring 2020, station improvement works have been underway at the station. Three elevators and a ventilation shaft will be installed, and the main entrance of the station will be renovated. Because of this, the main entrance building on rue d'Iberville was closed on 19 October 2020. Access to the station is available by the secondary entrance, which remains open. The station will be accessible once the construction is done by Fall 2023.

Connecting bus routes

Nearby points of interest
 St-Mathieu School
 St-Barthélémy School
 St-Barthélémy community center

Film and television appearances
D'Iberville station appeared in the 2013 drama movie Sarah Prefers to Run (French: Sarah préfère la course), directed by Canadian film director Chloé Robichaud. The movie was also Robichaud’s directing debut.

References

External links

D'Iberville station on STM website
Montreal by Metro, metrodemontreal.com
 2011 STM System Map
 Metro Map

Blue Line (Montreal Metro)
Rosemont–La Petite-Patrie
Villeray–Saint-Michel–Parc-Extension
Railway stations in Canada opened in 1986